"The Signal" is the sixth episode of the second season of the American sports comedy-drama television series Ted Lasso, based on the character played by Jason Sudeikis in a series of promos for NBC Sports' coverage of England's Premier League. It is the 16th overall episode of the series and was written by main cast member Brett Goldstein and directed by Erica Dunton. It was released on Apple TV+ on August 27, 2021.

The series follows Ted Lasso, an American college football coach, who is unexpectedly recruited to coach a fictional English Premier League soccer team, AFC Richmond, despite having no experience coaching soccer. The team's owner, Rebecca Welton, hires Lasso hoping he will fail as a means of exacting revenge on the team's previous owner, Rupert, her unfaithful ex-husband. The previous season saw Rebecca change her mind on the club's direction and working Ted in saving it, although the club is relegated from the Premier League. In the episode, Richmond prepares to compete for the quarter-finals of the FA Cup. Meanwhile, Rebecca is visited by her mother, who separated from her husband.

The episode received critical acclaim, with critics praising the performances, writing, themes and character development. For her performance in the episode, Harriet Walter was nominated for Outstanding Guest Actress in a Comedy Series at the 74th Primetime Creative Arts Emmy Awards.

Plot
With Roy (Brett Goldstein) joining as their coach, AFC Richmond has now won four games, improving their position. Meanwhile, Rebecca (Hannah Waddingham) has a one-night stand with a man he met on a site, when she is visited by her mother, Deborah (Harriet Walter).

Rebecca invites Ted (Jason Sudeikis) to lunch with her and Deborah, which he accepts. At the bar, Deborah announces that she is separating from Rebecca's father, although Rebecca notes that it happens quite often. Meanwhile, Jamie (Phil Dunster) is angry that Roy refuses to train him, despite having improved his behavior with the club. When questioned by Ted, Roy claims that Jamie has become an average player who will not reach his potential unless he brings out part of his aggresive past behavior, but only when is needed. When Jamie asks when will that time come, Roy just says he'll give him a signal.

AFC Richmond now competes with Tottenham Hotspur F.C. to enter the quarter-finals of the FA Cup. As Richmond is struggling, Roy decides it is time for "the signal", which consists of Roy, Beard (Brendan Hunt) and Nate (Nick Mohammed) giving Jamie the finger. Motivated, Jamie scores a goal via a free kick as the first half finishes. However, Ted has a panic attack, forcing him to leave the game with some minutes left. As Richmond is distracted, the Spurs seize the opportunity to score a goal via a corner kick. As Beard and Roy debate on what to do, Nate decides to substitute three of the players and be more aggressive, which leads to Richmond's victory when Jamie scores another goal. 

Nate is hailed by the media for his role in the victory, earning him respect among the public. Higgins (Jeremy Swift) also advises Beard to break up with his girlfriend, as she may not be suitable for him, although Beard still goes out with her. Rebecca tries to find Ted but fails to find him in the stadium and the offices. As she returns home, she finds that her mother left and claimed to reconcile with Rebecca's father. She prepares to meet with the man from the previous days, while she receives a message from her Bantr match, who turns out to be Sam (Toheeb Jimoh). As everyone leaves the stadium, Sharon (Sarah Niles) goes to her office, finding Ted, who wants a session.

Development

Production
The episode was directed by Erica Dunton and written by main cast member Brett Goldstein. This was Dunton's second directing credit, and Goldstein's second writing credit for the show.

Critical reviews
"The Signal" received critical acclaim. Myles McNutt of The A.V. Club gave the episode an "A-" and wrote, "'The Signal' has lots of great moments sprinkled throughout, but the central juxtaposition between a thrilling victory for AFC Richmond and an A.T.L. for Ted elevates the proceedings, and pushes the show into another gear at the halfway point in the season. And the most effective part of the episode is that although I have some lingering concerns stemming from the choices in last week's episode, I don't really know where things go from here: the team might be on an upward swing, but the show is descending into deeper emotional territory, and unpacking it has the potential to elevate the storytelling further. And sure, it could also mess everything up, but that's how television works, and we'll cross that bridge when we come to it." 

Alan Sepinwall of Rolling Stone wrote, "By sprinkling in more conflict — and repeatedly confronting the question of whether Ted's smiling persona is actually doing harm to both himself and the team — 'The Signal' was the season's most satisfying episode yet." 

Keith Phipps of Vulture gave the episode a 4 star rating out of 5 and wrote, "I still adore this show and think what it's doing in this second season — experimenting with what can be done with a sitcom without traditional conflicts — has been just as compelling as what it did in the first season." Becca Newton of TV Fanatic gave the episode a 4.5 star rating out of 5 and wrote, "Ted's panic attacks were bound to come up again, and having him suffer one now makes for a nice transition to the second half of the season." 

Linda Holmes of NPR wrote, "'The Signal' is a jam-packed episode, plot-wise, moving a bunch of stories forward in important ways. But nothing in it matters as much as Ted and Dr. Sharon." Christopher Orr of The New York Times wrote, "If this week's episode, 'The Signal', seems a bit scattered (and it does), it is in large part because it has returned to the nuts-and-bolts business of moving multiple subplots forward."

Awards and accolades
For the episode, Harriet Walter was nominated for Primetime Emmy Award for Outstanding Guest Actress in a Comedy Series nomination at the 74th Primetime Creative Arts Emmy Awards. She lost the award to Laurie Metcalf in Hacks.

References

External links
 

Ted Lasso episodes
2021 American television episodes
Television episodes written by Brett Goldstein